Black Enterprise is a black-owned multimedia company. Since the 1970s, its flagship product Black Enterprise magazine has covered African-American businesses with a readership of 3.7 million. The company was founded in 1970 by Earl G. Graves Sr. It publishes in both print and on digital, an annual listing of the largest African-American companies in the country, or "B.E. 100s", first compiled and published in 1973. In 2002 the magazine launched a supplement targeting teens, Teenpreneur. Black Enterprise also has two nationally syndicated television shows, Our World with Black Enterprise and Women of Power.

History 
The magazine was founded by Earl G. Graves Sr. In January 2006, he named his eldest son, Earl G. Graves Jr. (known as "Butch"), the company's chief executive officer. Butch joined the company in 1988 after earning his M.B.A. from Harvard University; he received his bachelor's degree in economics from Yale University in 1984. He also sits on the board of directors of AutoZone, serving as lead director and chairman of the compensation committee.

Black Enterprise has been profitable since its 10th issue. The company, headquartered in New York City, has 58 employees and had revenues of $22 million in 2017.

Award 
The magazine won the 1997 FOLIO: Editorial Excellence Award in the business/finance consumer magazine category.

See also
Black capitalism
List of magazines

References

External links
 
 Black Enterprise named one of the top 50 black owned websites
 Kevin Ross, "Breakfast Club Interviews Black Enterprise Magazine about Entreprneurship" [sic], Blogwallet.com, October 13, 2014.
"Black Enterprise Magazine" Interview with Earl G. Graves, Founder and Publisher of Black Enterprise, from KUT's In Black America series on the American Archive of Public Broadcasting, August 1, 1984

1970 establishments in New York (state)
African-American magazines
Business magazines published in the United States
Bimonthly magazines published in the United States
Magazines published in New York City
Magazines established in 1970
Magazine publishing companies of the United States
Black economic empowerment
Black-owned companies of the United States